Young Left is a socialist, Marxist, and feminist youth organisation. It is the official youth wing of the Swedish Left Party. The organisation calls themselves a "revolutionary youth organisation with roots in the communist part of the labour movement, anchored in the women's movement and influenced by the environmental- and peace movement."

Ideology
Young Left is a socialist, Marxist, and feminist political youth organisation committed to organising young people to work for social change that evolved out of the labour movement, with influences from environmentalism, the peace movement, and the feminist movement. Young Left works for social justice and a society characterised by equality, secularism, generous welfare provisions for all citizens, generous immigration policies, and respect for the environment. As its mother party, the Left Party, as well as the Social Democratic Party, Young Left is a strong supporter of the Swedish labour unions and the Swedish model, with conditions of work such as wages being regulated in branch-level collective agreements between the unions and the employers, rather than on individual basis. Ung Vänster has had various names and political alignments over the years, but is continuously characterised by the issues that have been at the centre of its history, such as antifascism, social justice, equality, and justice. During the past years, the main focus of the organisation has been the struggle against growing xenophobia in Sweden (as they mean been witnessed by the electoral success of the Sweden Democrats during the national elections of 2010) and criticism of the right government, and in particular on its privatisations of welfare services and priorities of tax reductions, rather than increased public spending on welfare and investments in infrastructure and renewable energy.

The Young Left, unlike the Left Party, are a revolutionary socialist organisation, which differentiates them from the more reformist Left Party in that they want to implement societal changes by revolution, and not reform.

Organisation
Young Left works together with and supports the Left Party and Vänsterns Studentförbund, but makes, on the basis of its own analyses, independent decisions regarding organisational and political issues.

History

Young Left was founded in 1903 as Socialdemokratiska Ungdomsförbundet (SDUF, Social Democratic Youth League). However, the youth league has clearly attached itself to the left-wing within the Social Democratic Party. At the outbreak of the First World War, the tensions within the party aggravated. In May 1917, the youth league together with the left-wing faction within the party took the initiative to form a new party, Sverges socialdemokratiska vänsterparti (Social Democratic Left Party of Sweden). SDUF became the youth wing of the new party. SSV joined the Communist International in 1919, and was renamed to Sveriges kommunistiska parti (Communist Party of Sweden). Following that, SDUF was renamed to Sveriges Kommunistiska Ungdomförbund (Young Communist League of Sweden), and became the Swedish section of the Communist Youth International.

In 1952, Democratic Youth was founded on the initiative of the party, in order to be a broader youth movement. Until 1958, SKU and DU existed as parallel organisations. In 1958, the two organisations merged and took the name DU.

In 1967, ultra-left elements took over the organisation, and broke away to form Marxist-leninistiska kampförbundet (Marxist–Leninist Struggle League). Reconstruction work started rapidly. In 1970, the organisation was re-baptised as Kommunistisk Ungdom (Communist Youth). By 1973, there was a national organisation in function, and, by 1975, an ordinary congress was held.

Young Left have published the youth magazine Röd Press since 1982, when Young Left lost the rights of its magazine Stormklockan to the Maoist MLK in a trial.

In Sweden, Young Left was one of the many forces behind the large 15 February 2003 anti-war protest.

Under the later years of the 2010s, different members of the Young Left have been excluded because of strong couplings to the Revolutionary Front and the AFA. The national executive board have been doing both official exclusions and cut-offs in these cases. This is because these groups are not deemed compatible with the democratic socialism and anti-racism fight that the Young Left are driving. The party board of the Left Party has also been strongly advising for hard consequences in these situations.

After having had a stable membership of between 1,500 – 2,800 for a number of years, the membership of the youth organisation had declined to 964 in 2016 according to the Swedish Agency for Youth and Civil Society.

Chairpersons

2021– 
2017–2021 
2015–2017 
2011–2015 
2005–2011 
2004–2005 Tove Fraurud
2001–2004 Ali Esbati
1996–2001 
1993–1996 
1989–1993 
1980–1989 Stellan Hermansson
1975–1980 Lars Johansson (sv)
1973–1975 Bengt Karlsson
1970–1973 Spokespersons: Bengt Karlsson, Urban Herlitz
1967–1970 Anders Carlberg
1964–1967 
1962–1964 
1957–1962 Rolf Utberg (DU)
1951–1958  (SKU)
19??–1951 Axel Jansson
?
1935–1939 Filip Forsberg
?
1921–1924 Nils Flyg
1909–1921 Zeth Höglund
1908–1909 Per Albin Hansson
190?–190? Fabian Månsson
1903–

Name changes
1903 Socialdemokratiska Ungdomsförbund (SDUF, Social Democratic Youth League)
1921 Sveriges Kommunistiska Ungdomsförbund (SKU, Young Communist League of Sweden)
1958 Demokratisk Ungdom (DU, Democratic Youth)
1967 Vänsterns Ungdomsförbund (VUF, Youth League of the Left)
1970 Kommunistisk Ungdom (KU, Communist Youth)
1991 Ung Vänster (Young Left)

References

External links
 

Youth wings of political parties in Sweden
1903 establishments in Sweden
Feminism in Sweden
Organizations established in 1903
Socialism in Sweden
Youth organizations established in the 1900s